"Vanilla" is singer-songwriter Leah Dizon's fifth single. It was released on June 25, 2008 and came in a Limited Edition CD+DVD version and a CD-only version which featured the bonus track "悲しみと笑顔の中で". The title track is an up-tempo dance tune "overflowing with R&B taste", while the B-side LOVE SWEET CANDY is a "medium-tempo reggae song."

Track listing

CD Track listing

 Vanilla
 LOVE SWEET CANDY
 悲しみと笑顔の中で (Kanashimi to Egao no Naka de; In Sadness and in a Smile) (CD only bonus track)
 Vanilla (Instrumental)
 LOVE SWEET CANDY (Instrumental)
 悲しみと笑顔の中で (Kanashimi to Egao no Naka de; In Sadness and in a Smile)　(Instrumental) (CD only bonus track)

DVD track listing

 Vanilla (music video)
 Making-of footage (video clip)

Charts
Oricon Sales Chart (Japan)

Leah Dizon songs
2008 singles
2008 songs
Victor Entertainment singles